In ancient Greece, an agonothetes (plural) was the president or superintendent of one of the sacred Panhellenic Games. At first the person who instituted the games and defrayed the expenses was the agonothetes; but in the great public games, such as the Olympic Games and Pythian Games, these presidents were the representatives of different states, or were chosen from the people in whose country the games were celebrated; thus at the Pythian Games at Athens ten  were elected for four years to superintend the various contests.

In English, by confusion with the native -s plural form, the singular agonothete and plural agonothetes are sometimes encountered.

Bibliography
Clément Sarrazanas, La cité des spectacles permanents : organisation et organisateurs des concours civiques dans l'Athènes hellénistique et impériale, 2 vol., Bordeaux, Ausonius Editions, 2021, 990 p. (ISBN 9782356133977).

References

Ancient Greek titles
Panhellenic Games